Zia McCabe (born Aimee Springer; June 2, 1975) is an American musician and realtor. She plays keyboards, percussion and bass guitar, and is a member of American alternative rock band The Dandy Warhols. She is also a solo DJ, and part of a six-piece country music band called Brush Prairie. She graduated from Battle Ground High School in Battle Ground, Washington in 1993. In 1995, with hardly any prior musical experience, McCabe joined The Dandy Warhols.

Personal life 
She married Travis Hendricks (The Dandy Warhols tour manager) on 7 October 2001. While pregnant with their daughter Matilda Louise, McCabe continued to perform and record, and managed to complete recording for Odditorium or Warlords of Mars one week away from childbirth. She split with Hendricks in 2011-2012. She licensed as a realtor in Oregon, and currently works under Windermere Realty.

Modeling
On March 7, 2005, McCabe posed nude while pregnant for the web site SuicideGirls featuring pictures taken by the SuicideGirl Anais. Her photos were posted simultaneously with photos of Anais taken by McCabe.

Political Advocacy 
McCabe has been politically active since at least 2008, engaging with issues from community initiatives to Federal level policy and candidates. Zia spearheaded community engagement in Portland, Oregon's Clean Water Portland campaign, endorsing Democratic candidate Bernie Sanders for President of the United States in 2016, and 2020, and has been active in supporting and normalizing cannabis usage at the state and federal levels.

References

Additional sources

External links
 

1975 births
Living people
Alternative rock bass guitarists
American rock bass guitarists
American rock keyboardists
Women bass guitarists
The Dandy Warhols members
American women in electronic music
Guitarists from Washington (state)
21st-century American women musicians
21st-century American bass guitarists
20th-century American women musicians
20th-century American bass guitarists